Gordons Chemists is a chain of more than 60 pharmacies, located in the UK.  Gordons Chemists is based primarily in Northern Ireland, with a number of branches also in Scotland; the chain is Northern Ireland's largest independent pharmacy chain.  

Gordons Chemists operates an online ordering and delivery service for Health & Beauty goods, via its Gordons Direct website, posting to UK and the Republic of Ireland.  

Gordons Chemists began as a single pharmacy in Donaghadee in 1980, and expanded mostly through the acquisition of other pharmacies.

References

Pharmacies of the United Kingdom
Pharmacy brands
Companies of Northern Ireland
Retail companies established in 1980
1980 establishments in Northern Ireland